China Southwest Airlines (CSWA) was an airline with its head office on the property of Chengdu Shuangliu International Airport in Shuangliu County, Chengdu, Sichuan, People's Republic of China. On 28 October 2002, China Southwest Airlines was merged into Air China.

Destinations
China Southwest Airlines' main hub was at Chengdu Shuangliu International Airport and its secondary hub was in Chongqing Jiangbei International Airport. It was the only airline flying to Lhasa Gonggar Airport until 2002. Although most routes from its hubs Chengdu and Chongqing were domestic, it also flew to Bangkok, Chiang Mai, Kathmandu, Kuala Lumpur, Singapore, Osaka and Seoul.

Fleet

China Southwest Airlines operated a fleet of Boeing 737-300, Boeing 737-600, Boeing 737-800, Boeing 757-200 and Airbus A340-300 aircraft. It had formerly operated other aircraft, including the Ilyushin Il-18D, the Tupolev Tu-154, and the Boeing 707.

Incidents and accidents
On January 18, 1988, China Southwest Airlines Flight 4146, an Ilyushin 18D crashed while on approach to Chongqing Airport. All 108 people on board were killed.
On October 2, 1990, a hijacked Xiamen Airlines plane (operated as Xiamen Airlines Flight 8301) sideswiped a China Southwest Airlines Boeing 707 before crashing into a third airliner. Nobody on the 707 died.
On February 24, 1999, Flight 4509, a Tupolev Tu-154 crashed into a field while on approach to Wenzhou Airport, killing all 61 passengers and crew members on board, and leading to the withdrawal of all of China Southwest's Tu-154 fleet.

See also
 Aviation industry in the People's Republic of China

References

External links

China Southwest Airlines  (Archive, 2002-2004)
China Southwest Airlines (Archive, 2000)
China Southwest Airlines (Archive) 
China Southwest Airlines Former Fleets Detail 

 
Defunct airlines of China
Transport in Sichuan

Air China
China Southern Airlines
Companies based in Sichuan
Government-owned companies of China
Airlines established in 1987
Airlines disestablished in 2002
Chinese companies established in 1987
Chinese brands
Chinese companies disestablished in 2002